The 1925–26 FA Cup was the 51st staging of the world's oldest football cup competition, the Football Association Challenge Cup, commonly known as the FA Cup. Bolton Wanderers won the competition for the second time, beating Manchester City 1–0 in the final at Wembley.

Matches were scheduled to be played at the stadium of the team named first on the date specified for each round, which was always a Saturday. Some matches, however, might be rescheduled for other days if there were clashes with games for other competitions or the weather was inclement. If scores were level after 90 minutes had been played, a replay would take place at the stadium of the second-named team later the same week. If the replayed match was drawn further replays would be held until a winner was determined. If scores were level after 90 minutes had been played in a replay, a 30-minute period of extra time would be played. This first edition of the competition with the modern naming convention of the FA cup first and second qualifying rounds became first and second round proper and what was previously called first round proper became third round proper.

Calendar

First round proper
At this stage 40 clubs from the Football League Third Division North and South joined the 25 non-league clubs who came through the qualifying rounds. Millwall, Bristol City, Crystal Palace and Plymouth Argyle were given a bye to the third round. Four Second Division sides, Barnsley, Darlington, Oldham Athletic and Swansea Town were entered at this stage. To make the number of matches up, seven non-league sides were given byes to this round. These were:

Clapton
St Albans City
London Caledonians
West Stanley
Northfleet United
Dulwich Hamlet
Southall

38 matches were scheduled to be played on Saturday, 28 November 1925. Seven matches were drawn and went to replays in the following midweek fixture, of which four went to another replay, and one of these went to a third.

Second round proper
The matches were played on Saturday, 12 December 1925. Four matches were drawn, with replays taking place in the following midweek fixture.

Third round proper
40 of the 44 First and Second Division clubs entered the competition at this stage, along with Third Division South teams Millwall, Bristol City, Crystal Palace and Plymouth Argyle. Also given a bye to this round of the draw were amateur side Corinthian. The matches were scheduled for Saturday, 9 January 1926. Nine matches were drawn and went to replays in the following midweek fixture, of which one went to a second replay.

Fourth round proper
The matches were scheduled for Saturday, 30 January 1926. Three games were drawn and went to replays in the following midweek fixture.

Fifth round proper
The matches were scheduled for Saturday, 20 February 1926. There were two replays, played in the next midweek fixture.

Sixth round proper
The four quarter-final ties were scheduled to be played on Saturday, 6 March 1926. There was one replay, between Nottingham Forest and Bolton Wanderers, played in the following midweek fixture. This then went to a second replay the week after.

Semifinals
The semi-final matches were played on Saturday, 27 March 1926. Both matches ended in 3–0 victories for Manchester City and Bolton Wanderers, who went on to meet in the final at Wembley.

Final

The 1926 FA Cup final was contested by Bolton Wanderers and Manchester City at Wembley. Bolton won by a single goal, scored by David Jack.

Match details

See also
FA Cup final results 1872-

References
General
Official site; fixtures and results service at TheFA.com
1925-26 FA Cup at rsssf.com
1925-26 FA Cup at soccerbase.com

Specific

FA Cup seasons
FA
Cup